Lake Bled is a lake in the Julian Alps of the Upper Carniolan region of northwestern Slovenia, where it adjoins the town of Bled. The area is a tourist destination.

Geography and history

The lake is of mixed glacial and tectonic origin. The lake lies in a picturesque environment, surrounded by mountains and forests. 

Lake Bled was an important cult centre during the Bronze Age. Gold appliqués dating from the 13th-12th century BC were found in a deposit by the lake shore. The embossed decorations on the appliqués are thought to represent the solar and lunar year. Similar appliqués have been discovered in Switzerland, Bavaria and Hungary, mainly in Bronze Age fortified settlements and in the graves of wealthy women.

Medieval Bled Castle stands above the lake on the north shore and has a museum. The Zaka Valley lies at the west end of the lake.

The World Rowing Championships were held at Lake Bled in 1966, 1979, 1989, and 2011.

For centuries, Europeans have flocked to the shores of Lake Bled to enjoy recreation, but also the medicinal benefits. Emperor Henry II, ruler of the Holy Roman Empire, enjoyed the lake so much that he built Bled Castle in 1004 to confer it as an estate. Today the castle is a popular tourist attraction.

Bled Island

The lake surrounds Bled Island. The island has several buildings, the main one being the pilgrimage church dedicated to the Assumption of Mary, built in its current form near the end of the 17th century, and decorated with remains of Gothic frescos from around 1470 in the presbyterium and rich Baroque equipment.

The church has a  tower and there is a Baroque stairway dating from 1655 with 99 stone steps leading up to the building. The church is frequently visited and weddings are held there regularly. Traditionally it is considered good luck for the groom to carry his bride up the steps on the day of their wedding before ringing the bell and making a wish inside the church.

The traditional transportation to Bled Island is a wooden boat known as a pletna. The word pletna is a borrowing from Bavarian German Plätten 'flat-bottomed boat'. Some sources claim the pletna was used in Lake Bled as early as 1150 AD, but most historians date the first boats to 1590 AD. Similar in shape to Italian gondolas, a pletna seats 20 passengers. Modern boats are still made by hand and are recognizable by their colorful awnings. Pletna oarsman employ the stehrudder technique to propel and navigate boats across the lake using two oars. The role of the oarsman dates back to 1740, when Maria Theresa of Austria granted 22 local families exclusive rights to ferry religious pilgrims across Lake Bled to worship on Bled Island. The profession is still restricted. Many modern oarsmen descend directly from the original 22 families.

Gastronomy 
The area's culinary specialty, a cream pastry (kremna rezina or kremšnita 'Cremeschnitte'), was designated a protected dish of designated origin in 2016 by the Slovene government. Although various Slovene cream pastries date back to the Habsburg era, the current "official" recipe was created in 1953 by Ištvan Lukačević, the former manager of the Hotel Park's patisserie. There is an annual festival dedicated to the pastry. It is estimated that 12 million cream pastries have been prepared at the Hotel Park's patisserie over the last 60 years.

Gallery

See also
Tourism in Slovenia

References

External links

Bled island website 
Lake Bled Tourism 

Bled
Bled
Bled
Bled
Sava basin
Wetlands of Slovenia
Islands of Slovenia